Agriculture in South Korea is a sector of the economy of South Korea. The natural resources required for agriculture in South Korea are not abundant. Two thirds of the country are mountains and hills. Arable land only accounts for 22 percent of the country's land. The most important crop in South Korea is rice, accounting about 90 percent of the country's total grain production and over 40 percent of farm income. Other grain products heavily rely on imports from other countries. Farms range in size from small, family-owned farms to large corporations, but most are small-scale and rely heavily on government support and services in order to survive.

History 
With the rapid growth of South Korea's economy and urbanization, areas of farmland have been decreasing and rural populations have moved from the countryside to cities. In addition to the decrease in farmland, there has been a decrease in rice demand due to the declining rates of rice consumption. In 1980, the average consumption of rice per capita was 137.7 kg. In 2018, only 61 kg of rice was eaten per capita. This decrease is partially due to the rising of wheat consumption of consumers.  In 2016, the average South Korean consumed 33.2 kg of wheat flour.

National Agricultural Cooperative Federation (NACF) is South Korea's Agricultural cooperative, which is a nationwide organization in charge of agriculture banking, supply of agriculture input factors and sales of agriculture products. The NACF was founded in 1961 with the goal of "improving the economic, social, cultural and status of agriculture people and enhancing the competitiveness of agriculture to improve the quality of life of farmers and contribute to the balanced development of the national economy.

In November of 2011, the government passed the Act on Development and Support of Urban Agriculture (Act of UA).  It was based upon the National Land Planning and Utilization Act which strives to create more farmland.  The goal of the Act of UA was to "develop a nature-friendly urban environment and contribute to the harmonious development of cities and rural communities by raising urban residents' understanding in agriculture". Seoul, South Korea's capital and largest, densest city, developed four categories of UA: "housing" which includes private homes and apartments, both indoors and outdoors; "in-city" which is the rooftops of public buildings; "farm-park" which uses abandoned land; and "education" which includes schools and colleges.  To promote the idea of urban agriculture, the municipal government of Seoul offered agricultural training classes and supplies such as seeds, tools, and containers to interested residents. By 2015, the municipal government had assisted in the development of "vegetable gardens on the rooftops of 267 buildings" and had provided "43,785 box-typed vegetable pots for 15,866 places".  In 2011, 29-ha were set aside in Seoul for the purpose of urban agriculture. By 2015, 118-ha were reserved for UA.

Due to challenges with an aging population of farmers, a shrinking number of farm laborers, the weakening of the Korea domestic farm market, and uncommon weather patterns, the government of South Korea has been promoting the idea of smart farms to farmers.  By offering financial and training support, the government is hoping to "bolster the competitiveness of domestic agriculture". These smart farms use information and communication technologies (ICT) to send real time information to mobile devices to farmers. Though the government has promoted smart farms, only a small percentage of farms has begun using the ICT.  Most farmers are poor and do not have the finances to invest in technology.  Also, most small farmers do not have the technological skills to change over to a "digital environment". In 2019, the agricultural ministry announced that 248 billion won would be budgeted for promoting smart farm technology.

Historical development
During the Paleolithic period, economic activities such as hunting and gathering have already occurred on the Korean Peninsula.In the Neolithic period, primitive agricultural planting began on the Korean peninsula.However, due to low productivity and low agricultural production, hunting and gathering were still the main production methods in the Neolithic Period. Entering the Bronze Age, with the production of exquisite bronze agricultural tools, the productivity of agricultural planting was greatly improved, and the planting industry began to replace hunting and gathering as the center of production. At the beginning of the Iron Age, irrigated plow farming methods began to appear, and productivity was further improved. During the Joseon Dynasty, agriculture has developed to a very advanced level. According to the Geography Records of Sejong, the agricultural early field in the early Joseon Dynasty had an absolute advantage, and the estimated ratio of water early field in Gyeonggi Province and other areas was 28% to 72%. According to the oldest agricultural book in South Korea, "Nongsa jikseol", in the 15th century, the most extensive agricultural cultivation in South Korea was yellow rice, millet, soybeans and rice, followed by crops such as wheat and ginseng. In the middle of the sixteenth century, the transplanting method gradually became a common method of paddy field cultivation. In the 18th century, the transplanting method was not only extended to Tianshui paddy fields (rice fields that can only be irrigated by rain), but also used in paddy and dryland agriculture. The original direct seeding method of rice has also been greatly developed.

Resource structure

Farmland
In 2022, South Korea’s agricultural land area was 1.698 million hectares, accounting for 17% of South Korea’s land area, of which two-thirds of the arable land was paddy fields, mainly for the cultivation of rice. In 2011, the area of rice fields in South Korea was approximately 854,000 hectares, accounting for 50.3% of the cultivated land area. With the development of urbanization and industrialization, Korea's self-sufficiency rate in food is decreasing due to the continuous decline of arable land. In 1949, South Korea promulgated the "Agricultural Land Reform Law." The government purchases land from landlords through agricultural land reform, and then allocates 3 hectares of land to each farmer, so that "the cultivator has his own land" and restricts the land area per person to no more than 3 hectares. In the 1960s, with the development of South Korea's non-agricultural economy, part of the agricultural land was converted to non-agricultural uses. The South Korean government began to expand the area of farmland by opening up wasteland and reclamation. In the 1970s, the global oil crisis and the outbreak of food shortages forced South Korea to promulgate the "Agricultural Land Protection and Utilization Act" in 1972, which strictly restricted the conversion of agricultural land to other uses. In 1975, South Korea enacted the "Agricultural Land Expansion and Development Promotion Law." The implementation of the "Agricultural and Fishery Village Development Special Measures Law" in the late 1980s changed the ownership of land from the original ownership of family farms that could only be operated independently to allow companies to own land ownership. In 1994, South Korea promulgated a new "Agricultural Land Law" that integrated previous agricultural land laws and regulations. Although the "Agricultural Land Law" follows the principle of "farmers have their land", in accordance with changes in economic and social development, restrictions on land ownership and use rights have been significantly relaxed. In 2002, restrictions on land ownership were finally abolished.

Agricultural population
With the rapid development of South Korea’s industrialization and urbanization, the proportion of agriculture and agricultural population in South Korea’s GDP and total population has also declined rapidly. From 1970 to 2005, the share of agriculture in South Korea’s GDP fell from 25.5% to 2.9%, an average annual decline of 6%; the share of agricultural population in the total population of South Korea fell from 49.5% to 7.6%, an average annual decline of 5.2%. The decline in the agricultural population is slower than the decline in the proportion of agriculture in GDP, which has resulted in a surplus of agricultural population. However, statistics show that the overpopulation in agriculture is due to the fact that people over 40 years old cannot find jobs in new industries and turn to agriculture. This has also increased the average age of the Korean agricultural population and reduced the competitiveness of the labor force structure.

The road to modern agriculture

Measures and contents of Korean modern agriculture
 Changes in the agricultural land system in South Korea
The first step is the reform of the “land equalization system”: After World War II, South Korea’s policy reclaimed the land occupied by Japanese officials and citizens and allocated it to South Korean farmers. It promulgated the Land Reform Law to purchase more than 3 hectares of land from farmers at low prices, and sold to tenants at a lower price. After this round of land reform, South Korea has basically achieved the goal of a land equalization system.
The second step is the intensive distribution of land: Since 1961, after 15 years of development, South Korea has completed the transition from an agricultural country to an industrial country. The government has also begun to gradually loosen restrictions on land sales and encourage farmers who work and do business to return their land. Farmers who are still engaged in agriculture have further expanded their business scale.
The third step is the modernization of land management: In 1994, South Korea enacted a new "Farm Land Basic Law", which further relaxed restrictions on land sales and leases, allowing the establishment of agricultural legal persons with a maximum of 100 hectares of land, and the government also encouraged 65 Farmers over the age of 5 years can also get a subsidy of US$2,580 per hectare if they sell or lease their land to professional farmers for more than 5 years.
 Agricultural protection policy
Increase the purchase price of agricultural products. Promote the "balanced price" system (cost + non-agricultural product price changes over the same period).
Improve the circulation conditions of agricultural products and agricultural machinery. A large number of agricultural products trading markets have been established, and agricultural machinery subsidies have been issued to farmers.
Promote the construction of "agricultural industrial area" plan. In the rural areas of counties and towns with less than 200,000 people, the government will select sites and carry out infrastructure construction to attract "private" capital to set up factories and enterprises, thereby reducing the proportion of local agriculture.
Adjust the rural industrial structure and agricultural structure. The government has invested heavily in adjusting the industrial structure, focusing on the development of secondary and tertiary industries, guiding scientific farming, supporting deep processing of agricultural products, and improving agricultural product circulation facilities.
Improve infrastructure. The South Korean government has adopted measures such as supporting the development of agricultural associations, increasing agricultural loans, and restricting the import of foreign agricultural products to protect and support the development of the country's agriculture.

Production
South Korea produced, in 2018:

 5.1 million tons of rice (15th largest producer in the world);
 3.3 million tons of vegetable;
 2.5 million tons of cabbage (4th largest producer in the world, losing only to China, India and Russia);
 1.5 million tons of onion (13th largest producer in the world);
 646 thousand tons of tangerine;
 553 thousand tons of potato;
 534 thousand tons of watermelon;
 475 thousand tons of apple;
 346 thousand tons of persimmon (3rd largest producer in the world, behind only China and Spain);
 344 thousand tons of tomato;
 333 thousand tons of cucumber;
 331 thousand tons of garlic;
 321 thousand tons of pumpkin;
 314 thousand tons of sweet potato;
 230 thousand tons of pepper;
 213 thousand tons of strawberry (7th largest producer in the world);
 205 thousand tons of peach;
 203 thousand tons of pear;
 177 thousand tons of grape;
 167 thousand tons of melon;

In addition to smaller productions of other agricultural products.

See also
Aquaculture in South Korea
New Community Movement
Rice production in South Korea
Ministry of Agriculture, Food and Rural Affairs (South Korea)

References

Further reading